Monsopiad was a Kadazan-Dusun warrior who was a famous headhunter. There is a memorial dedicated to him in Penampang, Sabah, Borneo, Malaysia.

The legend of Monsopiad
Legends tell that many centuries ago, a lady named Kizabon was pregnant. She lived in a house with her husband, Dunggou. On the roof of their house, a sacred Bugang bird made its nest and stayed there throughout Kizabon's pregnancy.

When the child was about to be born, the Bugang birds hatched as well. The father of the child took the sign as a good omen and that this was a sign that his newborn son would have special powers. He named his son Monsopiad. The father paid special care to the birds as well, and whenever his son took a bath, Dunggou would take the young birds down from their nest to have a bath with his son. When he was done, he later returned them to the safety of their nest. This was done diligently until the birds were strong enough to leave the nest.

The young boy grew up in the village Kuai, where his maternal grandfather was its headman. However, it was often plundered and attacked by robbers, and due to the lack of warriors in the village, the villagers had to retreat and hide while the robbers ransacked their homes.

Monsopiad, however, was given special training and he turned out to be an excellent fighter and grew up to become a warrior. Well-equipped, he vowed to hunt down and fight off the robbers that had terrorised his village for so long. He will bring back their heads as trophies, he claimed, and hang them from the roof of his house.

All he wanted in return was a warrior's welcome, where his success will be heralded by the blowing of bamboo trumpets. To prove that he really did as promised, three boys went with him as witnesses.

Just as he promised, Monsopiad's journey to rid his village of the robbers was successful and upon coming home, he was given a hero's welcome. He was so honoured by the welcome that he proclaimed that he will destroy all of his village's enemies.

Over the years, he soon attained a reputation that no one challenged him. However, Monsopiad's murderous urges disturbed him and he simply could not stop himself from beheading more people. Very soon, he started provoking other men into fighting him so that he could behead them.

With his changed attitude, all the villagers and his friends became afraid of him. Left with no choice, the village got a group of brave warriors together and they planned to eliminate Monsopiad. As much as they respected Monsopiad for his heroic deeds, they had no other choice, for he had slowly turned into a threat.

One night as planned, the warriors moved in for the kill as Monsopiad was resting in his house. As they attacked him, he fought back fiercely but realised that he had lost his special powers that were bestowed upon him by the Bugang bird. He was killed afterwards.

Despite his downfall, the villagers still loved Monsopiad for all that he had done for them. All in all, he collected 42 heads. In his memory, a monument was erected and the village was renamed after him.

Gallery

See also
 Sabah

External links
 Monsopiad Cultural Village (Official Website)

History of Sabah
People from Sabah